The 1971 All-Ireland Senior Camogie Championship was the high point of the 1971 season. The championship was won by Cork, who defeated Wexford by a 13-point margin in the final. The match drew an attendance of 4,000.

Semi-finals
Kilkenny won the Leinster Championship for the first time when they defeated Dublin 5–3 to 4–3 and received an unexpected bye to the All-Ireland final when  Galway withdrew, receiving a three-month suspension from Central Council for failing to fulfil the fixture.

Final
Cork took control of the final in the first half. Agnes Hourigan wrote in the Irish Press
The game was won and lost in the five minutes preceding the interval with Wexford leading 1-1 to 0-2 in the 20th minute when, Rosie Hennessy and Anne Comerford, last year’s captain, cracked home three Cork goals.

Final stages

MATCH RULES
50 minutes
Replay if scores level
Maximum of 3 substitutions

See also
 All-Ireland Senior Hurling Championship
 Wikipedia List of Camogie players
 National Camogie League
 Camogie All Stars Awards
 Ashbourne Cup

References

External links
 Camogie Association
 All-Ireland Senior Camogie Championship: Roll of Honour
 Camogie on facebook
 Camogie on GAA Oral History Project

All-Ireland Senior Camogie Championship
1971
All-Ireland Senior Camogie Championship
All-Ireland Senior Camogie Championship